is a Japanese manga artist and illustrator. Her work Himegoto has been adapted into an anime which began airing in Japan in July 2014. She also took charge of the illustrations for Daitoshokan no Hitsujikai: Hitoribotchi no Diva, one of the manga adaptations for Daitoshokan no Hitsujikai, an adult visual novel developed by August. She hosts a dōjin circle named .

She also voiced one of her own characters in her anime Himegoto.

She also streams on YouTube as Virtual YouTuber Inuyama Tamaki. The character is an otokonoko, a male who is cute and feminine, which parallels themes in Tsukudani's own works. She has also collabed with various other virtual YouTubers on their streams. She later created her own Vtuber agency named Tsukudani Norio Production (NoriPro) ran mostly by herself.

On 16 April 2021, as Inuyama Tamaki, she announced on Twitter that she had married a company owner during the month prior. On 17 April, she held a livestream, again announcing her marriage and showing her ring, as well as to commemorate and communicate with her fans.

References

External links
  
 
 NoriPro official site

Japanese illustrators
Manga artists from Niigata Prefecture
People from Nagaoka, Niigata
Living people
1993 births